Maurice Bocland or Bockland (20 April 1648 – by 28 November 1710) was an English Member of Parliament for Downton.

He was the son of Walter Bockland and father of Maurice Bocland, who also served as Members of Parliament.

External links
 John. P. Ferris, BOCKLAND, Maurice (1648-1710), of Standlynch, Wilts. in The History of Parliament: the House of Commons 1660-1690 (1983).
 D. W. Hayton, BOCLAND, Maurice (1648-1710), of Standlynch, nr. Downton, Wilts. in The History of Parliament: the House of Commons 1690-1715 (2002).

1648 births
1710 deaths
Alumni of Magdalen College, Oxford
Members of the Inner Temple
Members of the Middle Temple
English MPs 1661–1679
English MPs 1679
English MPs 1680–1681
English MPs 1681
English MPs 1685–1687
English MPs 1689–1690
English MPs 1690–1695
English MPs 1695–1698
Deputy Lieutenants of Wiltshire